This is a list of battalions of the Border Regiment, which existed as an infantry regiment of the British Army from 1881 to 1959.

Original composition
When the 34th (Cumberland) Regiment of Foot amalgamated with the 55th (Westmorland) Regiment of Foot, to become The Border Regiment in 1881 under the Cardwell-Childers reforms of the British Armed Forces, four pre-existent militia and volunteer battalions of Cumberland and Westmorland were integrated into the structure of the regiment. Volunteer battalions had been created in reaction to a perceived threat of invasion by France in the late 1850s. Organised as "rifle volunteer corps", they were independent of the British Army and composed primarily of the middle class. The only change to the regiment's structure during the period of 1881–1908 occurred in 1900, when a new volunteer battalion was raised, namely the 3rd (Cumberland) Volunteer Battalion.

Reorganisation

The Territorial Force (later Territorial Army) was formed in 1908, which the volunteer battalions joined, while the militia battalions transferred to the "Special Reserve". All volunteer battalions were renumbered to create a single sequential order. Alongside this, the 4th (Militia) Battalion was also disbanded in 1908.

First World War

The Border Regiment fielded 18 battalions and lost almost 7,000 officers and other ranks during the course of the war. The regiment's territorial components formed duplicate second and third line battalions. As an example, the three-line battalions of the 4th Borderers were numbered as the 1/4th, 2/4th, and 3/4th respectively. Many battalions of the regiment were formed as part of Secretary of State for War Lord Kitchener's appeal for an initial 100,000 men volunteers in 1914. They were referred to as the New Army or Kitchener's Army. The 11th and 12th Borderers, New Army "Service" battalions, were referred to as "Pals" Battalions because they were predominantly composed of colleagues. The Volunteer Training Corps were raised with overage or reserved occupation men early in the war, and were initially self-organised into many small corps, with a wide variety of names. Recognition of the corps by the authorities brought regulation and as the war continued the small corps were formed into battalion sized units of the county Volunteer Regiment. In 1918 these were linked to county regiments.

Inter-War
By 1920, all of the regiment's war-raised battalions had disbanded. The Special Reserve reverted to its militia designation in 1921, then to the Supplementary Reserve in 1924; however, its battalions were effectively placed in 'suspended animation'. As World War II approached, the Territorial Army was reorganised in the mid-1930s, many of its infantry battalions were converted to other roles, especially anti-aircraft.

Second World War
The Border Regiment's expansion during the Second World War was modest compared to 1914–1918. National Defence Companies were combined to create a new "Home Defence" battalion. In addition 12 battalions of the Home Guard were affiliated to the regiment, wearing its cap badge.  A number of Light Anti-Aircraft (LAA) troops were formed from the local battalions to defend specific points, such as factories. Due to the daytime (or shift working) occupations of the men in the LAA troops, the troops required eight times the manpower of an equivalent regular unit.

Post-World War II

In the immediate post-war period, the army was significantly reduced: nearly all infantry regiments had their first and second battalions amalgamated and the Supplementary Reserve disbanded.

Amalgamation
The 1957 Defence White Paper stated that the Border Regiment was due to amalgamated with The King's Own Royal Regiment (Lancaster), to form The King's Own Royal Border Regiment on the 1 October 1959.

References

Border Regiment, List of battalions
Border Regiment
Border Regiment
Battalions